Ahzee or at times Kevin Ahzee or DJ Ahzee is an American DJ and producer from New York, NY. Signed to BIP Records and House Garden Records and in the United States to Ultra Music, Ahzee has gained fame mainly in Europe, particularly France and Belgium, through "Born Again" that charted in both countries. He has also released "Drums" jointly with Belgian DJ diMaro (real name Mario Willems).

In October 2014, he was nominated for "Best Club Hit of the Year" for his single "Born Again" during the NRJ DJ Awards held at MICS - Monaco International Clubbing Show. He remains popular in France and in Belgium with his 2015 hit "Make a Wish" charting in Belgian Flanders chart.

Discography

Album
Addict (2018)

Singles & EPs

References

External links
Official website
Facebook

American DJs
Living people
Year of birth missing (living people)